Leonardo da Silva Gomes (born 30 April 1997), known as Léo Gomes, is a Brazilian footballer who plays as a midfielder for EC Vitória, on loan from Athletico Paranaense.

Career statistics

References

External links

1997 births
Living people
Brazilian footballers
Association football midfielders
Campeonato Brasileiro Série A players
Campeonato Brasileiro Série B players
Esporte Clube Vitória players
Club Athletico Paranaense players
América Futebol Clube (MG) players
Associação Chapecoense de Futebol players
Sportspeople from Fortaleza